The M72 road is a short metropolitan route in Johannesburg, South Africa. Its a single ring-road through the centre of Soweto.

Route 
The M72 begins roundabout at an intersection with Chris Hani Road (M68). It is a westerly ring road called Koma Street and starts in the suburb of Moroka. Heading westwards then northwards through various Soweto suburbs, passing by the Jabulani Civic Centre and the Jabulani Mall before heading north-east ending at an intersection at Elias Motsoaledi Road in the suburb of Mofolo.

References 

Streets and roads of Johannesburg
Metropolitan routes in Johannesburg